María Garcia-Almenta Poole (born 26 March 1997), better known as Maria Almenta, is a Spanish model and winner of the contest of the Elite Model Look Spain 2015 and she belonged to the Top 10 Girls in the international contest of Elite, after 26 years, when Inés Sastre won the contest in 1989.

References

External links
 María Almenta at Elite Model Management Barcelona.

1997 births
Spanish female models
People from Madrid
Living people